From In to Out is a live album by Jamaican-born jazz trumpeter Dizzy Reece featuring performances recorded in Paris in 1970 and released on the French Futura label.

Reception

The Allmusic review by Sean Westergaard awarded the album 3 stars stating "Overall, this is an excellent, well-recorded set, even if it's nothing groundbreaking or earth-shattering".

Track listing
All compositions by Dizzy Reece
 "Communion/Contact" -      
 "Krisis/Summit" - 
Recorded in Paris on October 23, 1970

Personnel
Dizzy Reece - trumpet
John Gilmore - tenor saxophone
Siegfried Kessler - piano
Patrice Caratini - bass
Art Taylor - drums

References

Futura Records live albums
Dizzy Reece albums
1970 live albums